The Gardiner Peak Lookout, on Gardiner Peak in the West Fork District of Bitterroot National Forest, near Darby, Idaho, was built in 1953.  It was listed on the National Register of Historic Places in 2018.

It is a 1936-pattern L-4 lookout.

It is a staffed lookout.  It is on Gardiner Peak, above the Selway River, within the Selway-Bitterroot Wilderness Area on the boundary between the Nez Perce National Forest and the Bitterroot National Forest.

References

Fire lookout towers on the National Register of Historic Places in Idaho
National Register of Historic Places in Idaho County, Idaho
Buildings and structures completed in 1953
Bitterroot National Forest
1953 establishments in Idaho
United States Forest Service firefighting